"Rockabye" is a song by British electronic group Clean Bandit, featuring English singer Anne-Marie as main vocalist together with Jamaican dancehall singer Sean Paul. It was released on 21 October 2016 and was their first single since Neil Amin-Smith's departure from the group and it serves as the lead single from their second studio album, What Is Love? (2018). The song is about hardships of single mothers and alludes to the nursery rhyme and lullaby, Rock-a-bye Baby. "Rockabye" is included on the deluxe edition of Anne-Marie's debut studio album, Speak Your Mind.

The song became 2016’s Christmas number one on December 23, 2016, beating the likes of Rag'n'Bone Man, Little Mix, Zara Larsson, Mariah Carey, Matt Terry and Louis Tomlinson & Steve Aoki to the Christmas number one spot. It is the first song in chart history to become Christmas number one after already being at the top of the charts for six weeks. In total, the song spent 9 weeks at the summit of the UK Singles Chart while also topping the charts in over 28 other countries.

Background and composition
"Rockabye" was written by Clean Bandit and Norwegian singer Ina Wroldsen, together with Amar Malik and Steve Mac. Wroldsen wrote the lyrics about her son, which, according to Grace Chatto, "is why it rings so true for Clean Bandit and is so emotional and special." Wroldsen originally provided the vocal for the song but at last minute was swapped for Anne-Marie. The band fought their label to get Ina on the records but failed. Grace described the situation as a terrible experience and she almost quit the band because she felt "I did feel like I couldn’t do it anymore because the idea that my business was hurting people … that was really painful. I went completely crazy for a while after that. I just had to carry on, but inside it was really hard.”. Clean Bandit announced the single on 21 October 2016, just two days after Neil Amin-Smith quit the band. Talking to Digital Spy, Chatto said, "We've wanted to work with Sean Paul for a long, long while and it's a dream that we've managed to finally do it. Anne-Marie tells the story and we love her voice. We first heard her singing with Rudimental and we've met her at a million festivals over the past couple of years – it's been so lovely to collaborate together". The song has a sample from Jerry Rivera's song "Amores cómo el nuestro"

"Rockabye" is written in the key of A minor. It was composed in common time with a tempo of 102 beats per minute, and follows a chord progression of Am–F–G–Em. The vocals span from G3 to E5.

Music video
The video has over 2.4 billion views on YouTube as of September 2020, making it the 34th most viewed video on the site. It was written and directed by Grace Chatto and Jack Patterson of Clean Bandit. Cinematography by Anna Patarakina and Daria Geller, who the band originally met when Jack was at film school in Moscow aged 21. They have worked on many music videos directed by Jack and Grace, including Mozart's House, Dust Clears, Symphony. The actress pole dancer in the video, Rita Conte, Grace met and cast in Italy. 
The video for the song was released on 21 October 2016, and has a running time of 4 minutes and 11 seconds. Parts of it were shot on location in Cap Sa Sal, Begur, Spain and the George Tavern, London.

Commercial performance
On 28 October 2016, "Rockabye" entered the UK Singles Chart at number 7. The following week, it climbed to 3, before high performance in streaming got it to number one on its third week, dethroning "Shout Out to My Ex" by Little Mix, making it their second number one after "Rather Be", it also became Sean Paul's third and Anne-Marie's first number one in the UK. It subsequently spent nine consecutive weeks at number one, became Clean Bandit's first number one single in Australia, and additionally reached number one in Austria, Finland, Germany, the Republic of Ireland, New Zealand and Switzerland.<ref
name="Ireland"/> On 23 December 2016, having already spent six weeks on top of the charts, "Rockabye" became the Christmas number one for 2016, making it the first song to do so that was not an X Factor winner's song, charity single, or stunt song since "Mad World" in 2003. However, it sold just 57,631 copies, becoming the lowest-selling Christmas number one of all time due to being helped by streaming (while actually being number two on the sales-only chart). It's gone on to spend a total of 41 weeks on the UK Singles Chart.

In the United States, "Rockabye" debuted at number 100 on the Billboard Hot 100 during the week of 24 December 2016, becoming Clean Bandit's first entry in this chart since "Rather Be" in 2014. It has since reached the Top 10, reaching a current peak of number nine, the group's highest-charting song, exceeding the number 10 peak of "Rather Be". It is also Anne-Marie's first entry on the Billboard Hot 100. On Billboards Dance/Mix Show Airplay chart, the song reached number one in its 18 February 2017 issue, giving both Clean Bandit and Sean Paul their second number one on this chart, as well as Anne-Marie's first.

Track listing

Digital download
"Rockabye" – 4:11

CD single
"Rockabye" – 4:11
"Rockabye" (Thomas Rasmus Chill Mix) – 3:38

Digital download – Remixes EP
"Rockabye" (Jack Wins Remix) – 5:05
"Rockabye" (End of the World Remix) – 2:54
"Rockabye" (Elderbrook Remix) – 3:28
"Rockabye" (Thomas Rasmus Chill Mix) – 3:38

Digital download – Lodato & Joseph Duveen Remix
Rockabye (Lodato & Joseph Duveen Remix) – 3:18

Digital download – Autograf Remix
Rockabye (Autograf Remix) – 4:09

Digital download – Eden Prince Remix
Rockabye (Eden Prince Remix) – 3:24

Digital download – Ryan Riback Remix
Rockabye (Ryan Riback Remix) – 3:54

Spotify Singles
"Rockabye"  – 3:45
"Work from Home" – 2:39

Charts

Weekly charts

Year-end charts

Decade-end charts

Certifications

Release history

References

Clean Bandit songs
2016 singles
2016 songs
Synth-pop ballads
Dancehall songs
Tropical house songs
Reggae fusion songs
Dutch Top 40 number-one singles
Irish Singles Chart number-one singles
Number-one singles in Australia
Number-one singles in Austria
Number-one singles in Denmark
Number-one singles in Finland
Number-one singles in Germany
Number-one singles in Mexico
Number-one singles in Russia
Number-one singles in Scotland
Number-one singles in Sweden
Number-one singles in Switzerland
UK Singles Chart number-one singles
Christmas number-one singles in the United Kingdom
Songs about parenthood
Anne-Marie (singer) songs
Songs written by Ina Wroldsen
Songs written by Steve Mac
Songs written by Ammar Malik
Songs written by Sean Paul
Songs written by Anne-Marie (singer)
Song recordings produced by Mark Ralph (record producer)